Annakoteshwara Temple, Annakoteswar Temple, or Annakotisvara Siva Temple is located in Latadeipur in Gondia tehsil in Dhenkanal district, Odisha, India. The Temple is dedicated to Lord Shiva with a stone shivalinga.

Architecture
The temple is a pancharatha temple having Rekha deula (Vimana) and a Pidha deula. The temple is decorated with Khakharamundi and Pidhamundis along the main Vimana. Several detached sculptures are kept in care. On the basis of construction the temple can be said to  be built around 16th century during Suryavamsi Gajapati rule. The Garbhagriha houses a circular Yonipeetha only. The Lingamurthy is displaced by attacks of Kalapahad who was a Muslim invader from the nawabs of Bengal near Murshidabad.

The temple is listed as a monument by the Archaeological Survey of India.

References

External links
photos of Annakoteshwara
report

Hindu temples in Dhenkanal district
Shiva temples in Odisha
Archaeological monuments in Odisha